Cyclobutadieneiron tricarbonyl is an organoiron compound with the formula Fe(C4H4)(CO)3. It is a yellow solid that is soluble in organic solvents. It has been used in organic chemistry as a precursor for cyclobutadiene, which is an elusive species in the free state.

Preparation and structure
It was first prepared in 1965 by Pettit from 3,4-dichlorocyclobutene and diiron nonacarbonyl: 
C4H4Cl2 + 2 Fe2(CO)9  →  (C4H4)Fe(CO)3 + 2 Fe(CO)5 + 5 CO  +   FeCl2
The compound is an example of a piano stool complex.  The C-C distances are 1.426 Å.

Properties
Oxidative decomplexation of cyclobutadiene is achieved by treating the tricarbonyl complex with ceric ammonium nitrate. The released cyclobutadiene is trapped with a quinone, which functions as a dienophile.

Cyclobutadieneiron tricarbonyl displays aromaticity as evidenced by some of its reactions, which can be classified as electrophilic aromatic substitution:

It undergoes Friedel-Crafts acylation with acetyl chloride and aluminium chloride to give the acyl derivative 2, with formaldehyde and hydrochloric acid to the chloromethyl derivative 3, in a Vilsmeier-Haack reaction with N-methylformanilide and phosphorus oxychloride to the formyl 4, and in a Mannich reaction to amine derivative 5.

The reaction mechanism is identical to that of EAS:

Related compounds
Several years before Petit's work, (C4Ph4)Fe(CO)3 had been prepared from the reaction of iron carbonyl and diphenylacetylene.  

(Butadiene)iron tricarbonyl is isoelectronic with cyclobutadieneiron tricarbonyl.

References

Carbonyl complexes
Organoiron compounds
Half sandwich compounds
Iron(0) compounds
Alkene complexes